Thomas Stradling may refer to:

Sir Thomas Stradling, 6th Baronet
Thomas Stradling (MP) (by 1495-1571) for Arundel and East Grinstead

See also